Key-independent optimality is a property of some binary search tree  data structures in computer science
proposed by John Iacono.
Suppose that key-value pairs are stored in a data
structure, and that the keys have no relation to their paired values. 
A data structure has key-independent optimality if, when randomly assigning the keys, the expected performance of the data structure is within a constant factor of the optimal data structure.  Key-independent optimality is related to dynamic optimality.

Definitions

There are many binary search tree algorithms that 
can look up a sequence of 
keys , where each 
For each sequence , let  
Let  be one of the
 possible
permutation of the sequence , chosen at random,
where
Let . 
Iacono defined, for a sequence , that . 

A data structure has key-independent optimality 
.

Relationship with other bounds

Key-independent optimality has been proved to be asymptotically equivalent to
the
working set theorem.
Splay trees are known to have key-independent optimality.

References

Trees (data structures)